Bwamiramira is a town in Uganda.

Location
Bwamiramira is in Buyanja County, Kibaale District, Bunyoro sub-region, in the Western Region of Uganda. The coordinates of the town are:0°46'57.0"N, 31°02'15.0" (Latitude:0.7825; Longitude:31.0375).

Points of interest
The following points of interest lie within the town limits or close to its edges:

 Bwamiramira Town Council
 Bwamiramira central market
 Mubende-Kagadi highway passes through the eastern part of the town

External links
 Kibaale District Internet Portal
 Profile at Afdevinfo.com

See also
Bunyoro

References

Populated places in Western Region, Uganda
Cities in the Great Rift Valley
Kibaale District